Count  was a Japanese politician. He was a leader of the "Freedom and People's Rights Movement" and founded Japan's first political party, the Liberal Party.

Biography

Early life 

Itagaki Taisuke was born into a middle-ranking samurai family in Tosa Domain, (present day Kōchi Prefecture), After studies in Kōchi and in Edo, he was appointed as sobayonin (councillor) to Tosa daimyō Yamauchi Toyoshige, and was in charge of accounts and military matters at the domain's Edo residence in 1861. He disagreed with the domain's official policy of kōbu gattai (reconciliation between the Imperial Court and the Tokugawa shogunate), and in 1867–1868, he met with Saigō Takamori of the Satsuma Domain, and agreed to pledge Tosa's forces in the effort to overthrow the shōgun in the upcoming Meiji Restoration. During the Boshin War, he emerged as the principal political figure from Tosa domain as a leader of the Jinshotai assault force, and claimed a place in the new Meiji government after the Tokugawa defeat.

Meiji statesman to liberal agitator 

Itagaki was appointed a Councilor of State in 1869, and was involved in several key reforms, such as the abolition of the han system in 1871. As a sangi (councillor), he ran the government temporarily during the absence of the Iwakura Mission.

However, Itagaki resigned from the Meiji government in 1873 over disagreement with the government's policy of restraint toward Korea (Seikanron) and, more generally, in opposition to the Chōshū-Satsuma domination of the new government.

In 1874, together with Gotō Shōjirō of Tosa and Etō Shinpei and Soejima Taneomi of Hizen, he formed the Aikoku Kōtō (Public Party of Patriots), declaring, "We, the thirty millions of people in Japan are all equally endowed with certain definite rights, among which are those of enjoying and defending life and liberty, acquiring and possessing property, and obtaining a livelihood and pursuing happiness. These rights are by Nature bestowed upon all men, and, therefore, cannot be taken away by the power of any man." This anti-government stance appealed to the discontented remnants of the samurai class and the rural aristocracy (who resented centralized taxation) and peasants (who were discontented with high prices and low wages). Itagaki's involvement in liberalism lent it political legitimacy in Japan, and he became a leader of the push for democratic reform.

Itagaki and his associations created a variety of organizations to fuse samurai ethos with western liberalism and to agitate for a national assembly, written constitution and limits to arbitrary exercise of power by the government. These included the Risshisha (Self-Help Movement) and the Aikokusha (Society of Patriots) in 1875.  After funding issues led to initial stagnation, the Aikokusha was revived in 1878 and agitated with increasing success as part of the Freedom and People's Rights Movement. The Movement drew the ire of the government and its supporters.

Leadership of the Liberal Party 

Government leaders met at the Osaka Conference of 1875, to which seven schools created under Itagaki's influence sent delegations, and the various delegates entered into an agreement by which they pledged themselves to the principle of a constitutional monarchy and a legislative assembly. They enticed Itagaki to return as a sangi (councilor): however, he resigned after a couple of months to oppose what he viewed as excessive concentration of power in the Genrōin. Itagaki criticized the government at the same time as it was under threat by the 1877 Satsuma Rebellion, which turned the cabinet against him. Legislation was then created restraining free speech and association.

In response, Itagaki created the Liberal Party (Jiyuto) together with Numa Morikazu in 1881, which, along with the Rikken Kaishintō, led the nationwide popular discontent of 1880–1884. During this period, a rift developed in the movement between the lower class members and the aristocratic leadership of the party. Itagaki became embroiled in controversy when he took a trip to Europe believed by many to have been funded by the government. The trip turned out to have been provided by the Mitsui Company, but suspicions that Itagaki was being won over to the government side persisted. Consequently, radical splinter groups proliferated, undermining the unity of the party and the Movement. Itagaki was offered the title of Count (Hakushaku) in 1884, as the new peerage system known as kazoku was formed, but he accepted only on the condition that the title not be passed on to his heirs. In 1882, Itagaki was almost assassinated by a right-wing militant, to whom he allegedly said, "Itagaki may die, but liberty never!"

The Liberal Party dissolved itself on 29 October 1884. It was reestablished shortly before the opening of the Imperial Diet in 1890 as the Rikken Jiyūtō.

In April 1896, Itagaki joined the second Itō administration as Home Minister. In 1898, Itagaki joined with Ōkuma Shigenobu of the Shimpotō to form the Kenseitō, and Japan's first party government. Ōkuma became Prime Minister, and Itagaki continued serving as Home Minister. The Cabinet collapsed after four months of squabbling between the factions, demonstrating the immaturity of parliamentary democracy at the time in Japan.
Itagaki retired from public life in 1900 and spent the rest of his days writing. He died of natural causes in 1919.

After Liberal Party 
In the Freedom and People's Rights Movement in Okinawa, Itagaki supported Jahana Noboru. In the Petition Movement for the Establishment of a Taiwanese Parliament, Itagaki and Lin Hsien-tang established The Taiwan Assimilation Society in 1914.

Legacy 

Itagaki is credited as being the first Japanese party leader and an important force for liberalism in Meiji Japan. His portrait has appeared on the 50-sen and 100-yen banknotes issued by the Bank of Japan.

Honors 
From the corresponding article in the Japanese Wikipedia

Peerages 
Count (9 May 1887; life peerage)

Decorations 
Grand Cordon of the Order of the Rising Sun (29 September 1896)
Grand Cordon of the Order of the Rising Sun with Paulownia Flowers (16 July 1919; posthumous)

Family crest of Itagaki clan

Genealogy 
Inui family（Itagaki family）　Their clan name　is Minamoto(Seiwa-Genji).
In this house, Edo period was a samurai in the Tosa clan from generation to generation.
Knight (senior samurai). Original Itagaki used "Jiguro-bishi (Kage-hanabishi)" for the family 
crest with Takeda of the effect for the same family. However, Inui used "Kayanouchi Jumonji" (Azuchi Period to Meiji Period), "Tosa Kiri" (Meiji Period to now).

Source
"Kai Kokushi". Matsudaira Sadayoshi. 1814. Japan.(Aduchi-Momoyama period part)
"Kwansei-choshu Shokafu". Hotta Masaatsu, Hayashi jyussai. 1799. Japan.(Aduchi-Momoyama period part)
"Osamuraichu Senzogaki-keizucho"(Edo period part)

Family 

 Wife 1:(daughter of Tosa domain samurai) Hayashi Masunojo Masamori's younger sister. (Name unknown)
 Wife 2:(2nd daughter of Tosa domain samurai Nakayama Yaheiji Hidemasa) (Name unknown)
 Wife 3: Rin (daughter of Tosa domain samurai Kotani Zengoro) Born on September 10, 1840. Marriage in 1859. Died on June 28, 1885.
 Wife 4: Kinuko, adopted daughter of Viscount Fukuoka Takachika. Araki Isoji's 7th daughter. (Born on June 8, 1859. Married on March 6, 1889. Died on April 13, 1938.
 Eldest son:Itagaki Hokotaro - Born on July 4, 1868. His mother's family name is Kotani.
 2nd son :Inui Seishi - Born on April 18, 1868. His mother was Doctor Hagiwara Fukusai's daughter, Yaku.
 3rd son :Araki Magozaburo - Born on October 6, 1885. His mother was Araki Isoji's 7th daughter Kinu. (He was born before his mother married Itagaki.)
 4th son:Itagaki Masami - Born on April 4, 1889. His mother's family name was Fukuoka. (He had same mother as Magozaburo.)
 5th son:Inui Muichi - Born on November 14, 1897. His mother's family name was Fukuoka.
 Eldest daughter:Hyo - She married Kataoka Kumanosuke. Born on August 4, 1860. Her mother's family name was Kotani.
 2nd daughter:Gun - She married Miyaji Shigeharu. Born on April 20, 1864. Her mother's family name was Kotani.
 3rd daughter:Yen - She divorced the first Yasukawa Jinichi. After that, she remarried to photographer Ogawa Kazuma. Born on May 16, 1872. Her mother's family name was Kotani.
 4th daughter:Chiyoko - She married Asano Taijiro (Asano Souichiro Jr.). Born on April 12, 1893. Her mother's family name was Fukuoka.
 5th daughter:Ryoko - She married Oyama Tomoe. Born on January 1, 1895. Her mother's family name was Fukuoka.

Notes

References
 Beasley, William G.  (1995). The Rise of Modern Japan: Political, Economic and Social Change Since 1850. New York: Martin's Press. 
 
 Jansen, Marius B. and Gilbert Rozman, eds. (1986). Japan in Transition: from Tokugawa to Meiji. Princeton: Princeton University Press. ;  OCLC 12311985
 Totten, George O. (compiled by). (1966). Democracy in Prewar Japan: Groundwork or Facade?. Boston: D.C. Heath and Company.  
Itagaki Taisuke Honouring Association (2019). The Mind of Count Itagaki Taisuke.  C0023

External links 

 Draft letter of resignation from the Cabinet by Itagaki in 1898 
 National Diet Library biography & photo

 
 

1837 births
1919 deaths
Meiji Restoration
Samurai
Boshin War
Japanese Buddhists
Japanese Protestants
Japanese military leaders
Government ministers of Japan
Kazoku
Liberalism in Japan
People of Meiji-period Japan
People from Kōchi Prefecture
People from Tosa Domain
Aikoku Kōtō politicians
Liberal Party (Japan, 1881) politicians
Ministers of Home Affairs of Japan
Politicians from Kōchi Prefecture